"Chuck Versus the Muuurder" is the nineteenth episode of the fourth season of Chuck. It originally aired on March 21, 2011. Chuck Bartowski is made the team leader and tasked with finding new Intersect candidates, but must solve a murder mystery when his recruits start turning up dead. Meanwhile, the Buy More and Large Mart staffs engage in mascot battle.

Plot

Main plot
General Diane Beckman tasks Chuck Bartowski to choose Intersect candidates who think and act similarly to him, as he is the only one who truly knows what it is like to be an Intersect. Chuck creates an extensive psychological profile based on his own personality and the CIA sends four appropriate candidates to the Buy More. First is Lewis (James Francis Ginty), a technical operations specialist and star hacker by age fourteen; due to a semester abroad, Lewis has adopted an English accent. Second is Josie (Karissa Vacker), a psychological warfare genius whose intuition makes her invaluable in interrogation. Third is Damien (Mousa Kraish), a Greek American agent whose "swarthy, bearded" appearance has led to him being embedded in one terror cell after another for the last ten years. Last to arrive is Brody "the Brodster" (Stephen Pollak), who is strikingly similar to Chuck. Chuck tasks John Casey with the candidates' physical testing, Sarah Walker with psychological evaluations, and Morgan Grimes  with testing their "cultural knowledge". Chuck ultimately chooses Brody. As Chuck informs Brody with a text message, Brody discovers someone planting an explosive at the door of Castle. Brody confronts the person, only to be stabbed to death and dragged away.

After Chuck and Director Jane Bentley (Robin Givens) find Brody's body, Chuck begins to panic about his leadership abilities. Bentley and the Intersect candidates surrender their weapons to Casey, as Chuck has realized the murderer must be one of them. To determine who killed Brody, Chuck plans to review security tapes and interrogate everyone. However, Damien believes that he is being suspected because of his appearance and angrily leaves. As he opens the door to exit Castle, however, an explosive is triggered. Though he manages to shield himself with the door, Damien is injured, ruling him out as a murder suspect.

The explosive triggers three others, cutting the main power to Castle and locking everyone inside. Chuck and Sarah interrogate Bentley, who has the most motive of the group, still angry about the failure of the G.R.E.T.A. program in the previous episode. Further investigation reveals that the candidates each had the motive and means to commit the murder, as Josie is emotionally unstable due to a recent breakup with her longtime boyfriend, Damien is angry about being typecast as a terrorist, and Lewis was Chuck's second choice for the Intersect. After the interrogations, Chuck and Sarah have come no closer to finding the killer than before. Suddenly, Chuck notices a bomb planted under the seat the interrogatees were sitting in, and he and Sarah barely escape with their lives. They regroup with Bentley and the candidates, though Lewis, the only bomb specialist in the group, is curiously missing.

With Damien unconscious after taking shrapnel to the back, the rest of the group decides that Lewis is the murderer and splits up to capture and interrogate him. Chuck and Bentley hear someone crawling in the air ducts, but Casey finds a pig (See "Buy More") instead of Lewis. Chuck and Bentley proceed to the NCS-restricted Intersect room, which is bombproof and the safest place in Castle. When they see Lewis hidden on railing near the room's ceiling, Chuck and Bentley draw their guns and lower the railing. However, they find Lewis's body, with his throat slit.

Chuck, Casey, and Sarah to confront Bentley and Josie, the only remaining suspects, only to find them accusing each and holding each other at gunpoint. Chuck reviews the day's events in his mind and recalls finding a positive pregnancy test in Josie's bag, explaining her emotions. He then accuses Bentley of being the murderer, as she was absent during every murder. When he moves closer to Bentley, however, he whispers that the actual murderer is Damien. As they draw their guns, Damien rises from his cot and threatens to detonate a boombox full of explosives if they do not get him to a doctor. Had Brody not seen him planting the explosives, Damien would have escaped. When he was forced to murder Brody and "cover his tracks", Damien strategically detonated the explosive and shielded himself with the door. He also planted the bomb under the chair during his interrogation and used the distraction to hide Lewis's body. Just as Damien reveals that he came for Chuck, Bentley shoots him and retrieves the boombox. She runs to the Intersect room and uses a manual release to lock the boombox in with her and save everyone else. As the one-minute timer counts down, Chuck hacks the door's control panels to save Bentley and they evacuate. The explosion sends the Large Mart piglet flying into Chuck's arms.

General Beckman congratulates the team for solving the mystery and saving Castle from destruction, with a special commendation to Chuck saying he is a true leader. Chuck humbly accepts and extends the credit to his teammates. Beckman then decides that it is too dangerous to upload the Intersect into a new recruit, leaving Chuck as the only Intersect for the foreseeable future. Bentley is reassigned to Washington and she apologizes for underestimating Chuck, relieving Chuck that he no longer has a nemesis. Later, as the team relaxes at Chuck's apartment, Beckman calls to inform them that Vivian Volkoff hired Damien. Chuck is dismayed that he has a nemesis again.

Buy More
Morgan learns from Big Mike that the Buy More is doing the same promotion as their competitor Large Mart. To promote the sale, Mike stands outside the store wearing a large "BM" on his chest in the Buy More colors, green and yellow. Suddenly, Large Mart employees drive up in a van and kidnap Mike. The Large Mart employees claim that the kidnapping was in retaliation for Buy More employees kidnapping Kevin Bacon. Morgan confronts Jeff Barnes and Lester Patel, who lead him to the closet where they have kept "Kevin Bacon", a pig revealed to be the Large Mart mascot.

Morgan meets with the Large Mart manager, Marvin (David H. Lawrence XVII), and several other employees to negotiate a trade. Marvin allows Morgan to call Big Mike, proving that he is alive and being fed. Morgan leads Marvin to the closet where Kevin Bacon was being kept, only to find the pig missing.

Morgan questions Jeff and Lester about the location of the pig, but to no avail. They finally reveal that they have hidden the pig in the air ducts, just as Casey finds him in Castle. Later, an explosion sends the piglet flying into Chuck's arms.

Just as Morgan rallies the Buy More staff to rescue Big Mike, the latter walks through the main door, having easily escaped his "nerd" guards. But their victory is short-lived, as Large Mart employees bring the BM costume to the front door and light it on fire. Chuck then enters the Buy More with the pig, quickly deducing everything that's happened.

The Orion laptop
Ellie Bartowski-Woodcomb continues using the laptop left by her father Stephen J. Bartowski (Orion), having been given the laptop by Bentley in the previous episode. Ellie studies her father's research and praises his intelligence and creativity. Concerned about his wife's obsession, Devon Woodcomb asks if she should be digging through her father's work, to which Ellie simply replies, "What's the worst that can happen?". Devon calls Chuck, and they agree to keep Ellie out of the spy world. Chuck suggests replacing the computer's hard drive with a blank one, which would make Ellie believe it was simply broke.

Meanwhile, Bentley has taken extreme measures in salvaging her credibility by monitoring Ellie's activity on the laptop. Chuck confronts Bentley about interfering with his family, and discovers a surveillance video of Ellie. Bentley later comments that Ellie, is incredibly smart and that if anyone could figure out the Intersect it is her, though she cautions Chuck about taking Ellie into the spy world.

As Devon switches the hard drive with a blank one, Ellie arrives home, having realized the purpose of her father's research. Ellie reveals that Stephen was trying to upload knowledge into the brain without having to learn it. Devon still delivers the hard drive to Chuck; when he returns to Ellie, however, it is revealed that Ellie is still working on same research. Devon and Ellie have agreed to hide the truth from Chuck.

While Ellie is asleep, the laptop scans the room and identifies her, allocating her files and displaying the words "Agent X Files".

Production

Series co-creator Chris Fedak revealed to EW.com, "We've always wanted to do a murder mystery, so we're working on an episode right now where something terrible happens to someone down in Castle and Chuck and Co. are given the Sherlockian job of figuring out who the murder[er] is... So we're working on our own spy version of a chamber piece."

The use of Journey's song "Any Way You Want It" as Brody's ringtone alludes to the pilot episode, where Chuck had the same ringtone when receiving a call from Morgan.

Music
Songs listed by Alan Sepinwall.
 "I Need You" by The Blood Arm
 "Any Way You Want It" by Journey
 "Victim" by Win Win
 "Move to the Mountains" by Clock Opera

Cultural references
 Chuck continually mentions his failed leadership attempt the last time he played Dungeons & Dragons.
 Chuck reveals that Lewis's World of Warcraft guild pioneered in taking down Deathwing.
 Morgan is tasked with testing the candidates' "cultural knowledge", asking the following questions:
 "Rush's best album?"
 Lewis answers Caress of Steel.
 "Charlton Heston sci-fi question for you. What's cooler: Soylent Green or Omega Man?"
 Damien identifies it as a trick question and answers "POTA" (Planet of the Apes).
 "Favorite Bond: Connery excluded?"
 "Most important graphic novelist: Grant Morrison or Moore/Gibbons?"
 Brody and Chuck agree on Brian K. Vaughan.
 When Chuck finds a knife in Lewis's bag, he says, "Well lookie what we have here." This is in reference to the line from Back to the Future.
 The Large Mart pig is named "Kevin Bacon" after the actor of the same name.
 In response to Chuck ruling out Lewis as the killer after finding his body, Bentley says, "Brilliant deduction, Sherlock", referencing the fictional detective Sherlock Holmes.

Reception
"Chuck Versus the Muuurder" received generally positive reviews from critics. HitFix writer Alan Sepinwall wrote that "the actual muuurder investigation of 'Chuck vs. the Muuurder' was the least interesting part of an episode that I enjoyed on the whole. It's such a familiar device that we know a lot of how it works, including the way that the first suspect or two simply can't have done it because we still have a lot of time to fill. The four Intersect candidates were all fairly cartoonish, even by 'Chuck' standards... and the Bentley character has suffered from one of the few real guest casting missteps this show has made in a while, so I didn't particularly care which of them did it, so long as most of them (with the ironic exception of our swarthy bearded killer) were off my screen for good by episode's end... Fortunately, the murder mystery had a secondary element to it in Chuck's need to prove himself as a leader, and that part of the story was very strong." Steve Heisler of The A.V. Club gave the episode a C+. Though he criticized the lack of importance of the series' civilian characters (excluding Morgan) in the episode, he wrote that the episode was "decent fun." Heisler concluded, "'Muuurder' took on a lot, and to its credit managed to make some sense of it all, even if it did resort to cheap, repetitive BM humor (not that I'm above a good BM joke). It's just that, at the end of the day, nothing much happened."

Eric Goldman of IGN gave this episode a score of 9 out of 10, writing, "After an off episode last week, this was a much more enjoyable Chuck installment, that took a time-honored formula ('One of us is a murderer!') and ran with it in classic Chuck style... Some episodes do a better job with a Buy More subplot than others, but the one this week was pretty great... The way this plotline merged with Chuck's had a rather hysterical payoff. I loved seeing little Kevin Bacon running for his life and then being blasted forward by an explosion, in a classic action movie hero style."

The episode continued Chuck's steady decline in viewership, drawing 4.23 million viewers, a series low at the time of the episode's airing.

References

External links
 

Muuurder
2011 American television episodes